Falcke v Scottish Imperial Insurance Co (1886) 34 Ch 234 is an English unjust enrichment law case, which also concerns English contract law. It sets out some fundamental principles of construction of obligations, as viewed to exist by the late 19th-century English judiciary.

Facts
Falcke owned the first mortgage on the life insurance policy of the Duchess de Beaufremont. There were many mortgages on it. Emmanuel paid a large premium on the policy to preserve its value because he mistakenly thought he was the ultimate owner of the equity, or he bought out the interests in the policy that were in priority to his. He claimed he should have a lien on the policy for the premium he just paid, because otherwise the whole life insurance policy would have lapsed.

Judgment
Bowen LJ held that Emmanuel could get no lien on the basis of his mistake, or his saving the policy. Falcke did not request it, know about it, or acquiesce in the payment. So the entire value of the policy belonged to Falcke.

Fry LJ concurred.

See also
English unjust enrichment law

Notes

References

1886 in case law
English unjust enrichment case law
English contract case law
1866 in British law
Court of Chancery cases